St. Saviour's Church is a congregation of the Church of England in Riga, Latvia. Its parish church is located at Anglikāņu iela 2. This is to the north of the old town centre (Vecrīga), close to Riga Castle and the banks of the Daugava River.

The neo-Gothic church was designed by Johann Felsko. The foundation stone was laid in 1857 and the church was consecrated on 26 July 1859 by Bishop Walter Trower. Church use was halted during the Soviet occupation, and in 1973 it became the home of the Riga Polytechnic Institute student club.

After Latvia regained its independence in 1991, an English-speaking congregation was again formed under the guidance of Lutheran Pastor Arden Haug. In 1995 the Latvian-born Reverend Dr Juris Calitis became the pastor of a growing congregation. Jāna Jēruma-Grīnberga was installed as priest-in-charge in October 2014, succeeding Cālītis. Elīza Zikmane became chaplain in 2020.
 
The church operates a soup kitchen for homeless people in the undercroft, and supports a club for the elderly (Senioru klubs).

Historical records are held in London Metropolitan Archives.

References

External links

 

Churches in Riga
Anglican church buildings in Latvia
19th-century Anglican church buildings
Churches completed in 1859
Diocese in Europe
1859 establishments in the Russian Empire
Religious organizations established in 1859
19th-century churches in Latvia